Saint Africus was a 7th-century French Roman Catholic saint about whom very little is known. He was the Confessor of Comminges and also the bishop of Comminges in southern France (Haute-Garonne).

His 7th century shrine was destroyed by Calvinists. His feast day is celebrated November 16. His tomb was in the town of Saint Affrique.

Sources
 St Africus

7th-century deaths
Bishops of Comminges
7th-century Frankish saints
Year of birth unknown